The Immediate Geographic Region of Espinosa is one of the 7 immediate geographic regions in the Intermediate Geographic Region of Montes Claros, one of the 70 immediate geographic regions in the Brazilian state of Minas Gerais and one of the 509 of Brazil, created by the National Institute of Geography and Statistics (IBGE) in 2017.

Municipalities 
It comprises 8 municipalities.

 Catuti
 Espinosa
 Gameleiras
 Mamonas
 Mato Verde
 Monte Azul
 Montezuma
 Santo Antônio do Retiro

References 

Geography of Minas Gerais